The Mexico City Metrobús Line 3 is a bus rapid transit line in the Mexico City Metrobús. It operates between Tenayuca, in the limits with the State of Mexico in Gustavo A. Madero and Pueblo Santa Cruz Atoyac in the Benito Juárez boroughs, in southern Mexico City.

Line 3 has a total of 38 stations and a length of 20 kilometers and it runs from north to south.

Construction of Line 3 started on March 5, 2010 and it was inaugurated on February 8, 2011 by Marcelo Ebrard, Head of Government of the Federal District from 2006 to 2012.

In 2019, the Government of Mexico City announced 7 new stations to the south, ending near Hospital Xoco. Construction was expected to end by June 2020.

On March 10, 2021, had opening 5 new stations.

Service description

Services
The line has five itineraries.

Tenayuca to Pueblo Santa Cruz Atoyac
To Pueblo Santa Cruz Atoyac
First Bus: 4:30 (Monday-Friday)
Last Bus: 23:24 (Monday-Friday)
First Bus: 4:30 (Saturday)
Last Bus: 23:27 (Saturday)
First Bus: 5:00 (Sunday)
Last Bus: 23:20 (Sunday)

To Tenayuca
First Bus: 4:28 (Monday-Friday)
Last Bus: 00:21 (Monday-Friday)
First Bus: 4:30 (Saturday)
Last Bus: 00:21 (Saturday)
First Bus: 5:05 (Sunday)
Last Bus: 00:14 (Sunday)

Tenayuca to Balderas
From Tenayuca
First Bus: 6:00 (Monday-Friday)
Last Bus: 21:49 (Monday-Friday)
First Bus: 6:00 (Saturday)
Last Bus: 21:33 (Saturday)
First Bus: 7:00 (Sunday)
Last Bus: 21:20 (Sunday)

To Tenayuca
First Bus: 6:00 (Monday-Friday)
Last Bus: 22:36 (Monday-Friday)
First Bus: 6:37 (Saturday)
Last Bus: 22:17 (Saturday)
First Bus: 7:37 (Sunday)
Last Bus: 22:05 (Sunday)

Tenayuca to Buenavista
From Tenayuca
First Bus: 5:00 (Monday-Friday)
Last Bus: 23:40 (Monday-Friday)
First Bus: 5:00 (Saturday)
Last Bus: 23:40 (Saturday)
First Bus: 6:00 (Sunday)
Last Bus: 23:35 (Sunday)

To Tenayuca
First Bus: 4:58 (Monday-Friday)
Last Bus: 00:19 (Monday-Friday)
First Bus: 5:00 (Saturday)
Last Bus: 00:16 (Saturday)
First Bus: 6:00 (Sunday)
Last Bus: 00:11 (Sunday)

Tenayuca to La Raza
From Tenayuca
First Bus: 4:45 (Monday-Friday)
Last Bus: 23:12 (Monday-Friday)
First Bus: 4:45 (Saturday)
Last Bus: 23:17 (Saturday)
First Bus: 5:30 (Sunday)
Last Bus: 23:07 (Sunday)

To Tenayuca
First Bus: 4:45 (Monday-Friday)
Last Bus: 23:40 (Monday-Friday)
First Bus: 4:44 (Saturday)
Last Bus: 23:43 (Saturday)
First Bus: 5:29 (Sunday)
Last Bus: 23:34 (Sunday)

Pueblo Santa Cruz Atoyac to Indios Verdes
From Pueblo Santa Cruz Atoyac
First Bus: 4:34 (Monday-Friday)
Last Bus: 23:46 (Monday-Friday)
First Bus: 6:04 (Saturday)
Last Bus: 00:33 (Saturday)
First Bus: 6:04 (Sunday)
Last Bus: 00:33 (Sunday)

To Indios Verdes
First Bus: 4:30 (Monday-Friday)
Last Bus: 22:42 (Monday-Friday)
First Bus: 5:00 (Saturday)
Last Bus: 23:29 (Saturday)
First Bus: 5:00 (Sunday)
Last Bus: 23:29 (Sunday)

Line 3 services the Gustavo A. Madero, Azcapotzalco, Cuauhtémoc and Benito Juárez boroughs.

Station list

Tenayuca–Pueblo Santa Cruz Atoyac route

{| class="wikitable"
|-
! width="150px" | Stations
! Connections
! Neighborhood(s) 
! width="100px" | Borough
! Picture
! Date opened
|-
|  Tenayuca
| 
| rowspan=2| Santa Rosa, San José de la Escalera
| rowspan=4| Gustavo A. Madero
| 
| rowspan=32| February 8, 2011
|-
|  San José de la Escalera
|
|-
|  Tres Anegas
|
| Amp. Progreso Nacional
|-
|  Júpiter
|
| Nueva Industrial Vallejo
| 
|-
|  La Patera
|
 Route: 107-B
| Industrial Vallejo, Nueva Industrial Vallejo
| rowspan=10| Azcapotzalco, Gustavo A. Madero
|-
|  Poniente 146
|
| rowspan=2| Industrial Vallejo, Nueva Vallejo
| 
|-
|  Montevideo
|
 : Line 6: Montevideo station
| 
|-
|  Poniente 134
|
  Line 6: Vallejo station
|  Lindavista Vallejo III Sección
| 
|- 
|  Poniente 128
|
  Line 6: Vallejo station
| Santa Cruz de las Salinas, Nueva Vallejo
| 
|-
|  Magdalena de las Salinas
|
| rowspan=2| Coltongo, Magdalena de las Salinas
|-
|  Coltongo
|
 Route: 15-A
|-
|  Cuitláhuac
|
 Routes: 11-A, 12
 Line 4: Calzada Vallejo stop
| Pro Hogar, Guadalupe Victoria
| 
|- 
|  Héroe de Nacozari
|
 Route: 20-C
| Porvernir, Héroe de Nacozari
| 
|-
|  Hospital La Raza
|
 Route: 20-C
| San Francisco Xocotitla, Vallejo Poniente
| 
|-
|  La Raza
| 
  Line 1: La Raza station
 La Raza
  Line 3: La Raza station
  Line 5: La Raza station
  Line IV: La Raza station (under construction)
 Routes: 11-A (at distance), 12 (at distance), 23, 27-A, 103
 Line 1: La Raza stop (north–south route)
 Routes: 7-D (at distance), 20-C, 20-D
| Vallejo Poniente
| Gustavo A. Madero
| 
|-
|  Circuito
| 
  Line 1: Circuito station
 Route: 200
 Routes: 7-D (at distance), 20-A, 20-D
| Santa María Insurgentes
| rowspan=15| Cuauhtémoc
| 
|-
|  Tolnáhuac
| 
| San Simón Tolnáhuac
| 
|-
|  Tlatelolco
| 
  Line 3: Tlatelolco station (at distance)
 Route: 10-B
| Nonoalco Tlatelolco
| 
|-
|  Ricardo Flores Magón
| 
 Route: 18
| rowspan=4| Buenavista, Guerrero
| 
|-
|  Guerrero
| 
  Line 3: Guerrero station
  Line B: Guerrero station
 Routes: 10-E, 11-C
| 
|-
|  Buenavista
| 
  Line 1: Buenavista station
  Line 4: Buenavista station
 Buenavista
 (at distance)
  Line B: Buenavista station
 Line 1: Buenavista station
 Routes: 10-E, 11-C, 12-B
| 
|-
|  Mina
| 
| 
|-
|  Hidalgo
| 
  Line 4: Hidalgo station (north route)
  Line 7: Hidalgo station
<li> (at distance)
<li>  Line 2: Hidalgo station
<li>  Line 3: Hidalgo station
<li> Route: 27-A
<li> Line 5: Metro Hidalgo stop
<li> Route: 16-A
| rowspan=3| Centro
| 
|-
|  Juárez
| 
<li>  Line 4: Juárez station (south route)
<li>
<li>  Line 3: Juárez station
| 
|-
|  Balderas
|
<li>
<li>  Line 1: Balderas station
<li>  Line 3: Balderas station
<li> Route: 34-A
<li> Routes: 19-E, 19-F, 19-G, 19-H
| 
|-
|  Cuauhtémoc
| 
<li>
<li>  Line 1: Cuauhtémoc station
<li> Route: 34-A
<li> Line 2: Cuauhtémoc stop
<li> Routes: 19-E, 19-F, 19-G, 19-H
| rowspan=3| Roma Norte, Doctores
| 
|-
|  Jardín Pushkin
|
<li>
| 
|-
|  Hospital General
| 
<li>
<li>  Line 3: Hospital General station
<li> Line 2: Hospital General stop
<li> Line 2: Dr. Lucio stop(at distance)
<li> Routes: 9-A, 9-C, 9-E (at distance), 19-F
| 
|-
|  Dr. Márquez
| 
<li>
| rowspan=2| Roma Sur, Doctores
| 
|-
|  Centro Médico
|
<li>
<li>  Line 3: Centro Médico station
<li>  Line 9: Centro Médico station
<li> Routes: 9-A, 9-C, 9-E
| 
|-
|  Obrero Mundial
| 
<li>
| Piedad Narvarte
| rowspan=7| Benito Juárez
| 
|-
|  Etiopía / Plaza de la Transparencia
| 
<li>  Line 2: Etiopía / Plaza de la Transparencia station
<li>
<li>  Line 3: Etiopía / Plaza de la Transparencia station
| Narvarte Poniente
| 
|-
|  Luz Saviñón
| 
<li> (at distance)
| Narvarte Poniente, Narvarte Oriente
| 
| rowspan=5| March 10, 2021
|-
|  Eugenia
|
<li>
<li>  Line 3: Eugenia station
| rowspan=2| Narvarte Poniente
| 
|-
|  División del Norte
|
<li>
<li>  Line 3: División del Norte station
| 
|-
|  Miguel Laurent
|
| Letrán Valle
|
|-
|  Pueblo Santa Cruz Atoyac
| <li> Zapata (at distance)
<li> (at distance)
<li>  Line 3: Zapata station (at distance)
<li>  Line 12: Zapata station (at distance; out of service)
<li>  Line 12: Parque de los Venados station (at distance; out of service)
<li> Routes: 1-D, 52-C, 120, 121-A (also temporary Line 12 service)
<li> Line 3: Zapata 1 stop, Zapata 2 stop (both at distance)
<li> Route: 6-A
| Del Valle Sur
| 
|}

Pueblo Santa Cruz Atoyac–Indios Verdes route
The route runs from Pueblo Santa Cruz Atoyac to Mina normally. As soon as it reaches Avenida Mosqueta (Eje 1 Norte), the route detours towards Avenida de los Insurgentes. Starting at Buenavista, the route shares the same stations Line 1 uses.

Operator
Movilidad Integral de Vanguardia, SAPI de CV (MIV) is the sole operator of Line 3.

Notes

References

2011 establishments in Mexico
3
Bus rapid transit in Mexico